Olga Brózda (born 26 January 1986) is an inactive Polish tennis player.

As a professional, her career-high WTA rankings are 281 in singles, achieved in April 2008, and 135 in doubles, set in August 2009. She reached twelve finals on the ITF Women's Circuit in singles, which six of them she won. In doubles, she has won 48 ITF titles. Her regular doubles partners are Magdalena Kiszczyńska or Natalia Kołat.

ITF Circuit finals

Singles: 12 (6 titles, 6 runner-ups)

Doubles: 77 (48 titles, 29 runner-ups)

References

External links
 
 

1986 births
Living people
Sportspeople from Poznań
Polish female tennis players
20th-century Polish women
21st-century Polish women